Orobanche densiflora is a species of plant in the family Orobanchaceae. O. densiflora f. melitensis was reputed to be endemic to Malta however such information is not corroborated by recent accounts.

References

Endemic flora of Malta
densiflora
Plants described in 1846